Ngozi Sylvia Oluchi Ezeokafor (commonly known as Sylvya Oluchy) is a Nigerian actress. She won the Most Promising Act of the Year award in the Best of Nollywood Awards. She shared photos of herself in a semi-nude way. She then said in an interview with Showtime Celebrities that she sees no big deal in going nude.

Early life 
Sylvia Oluchi was born in Lagos and raised in Abuja. She studied theatre Arts at the Nnamdi Azikiwe University in Awka, Anambra State.

Career 
According to her, she never wanted to be an actress until her mom told her "you will make a good actress" after noticing her unique talent in mimicking her school teachers. In 2011, she played the role of Shaniqua in the popular Atlanta TV series. During interviews with Best of Nollywood Magazine and YES International Magazine Sylvia made national headlines when asked if she had any boundaries or limits her acting profession, she replied "I don’t have any boundaries because my body is my laptop. Others have their laptops and files, what I have are body and voice, Even the concept of nudity, I don’t have any problems what so ever..."

Filmography

Awards

See also
 List of Nigerian actors

References

External links

Year of birth missing (living people)
Living people
21st-century Nigerian actresses
Actresses from Lagos
Nnamdi Azikiwe University alumni
Nigerian film award winners
Igbo actresses
Nigerian film actresses
Nigerian media personalities